Aquatic plants are used to give the aquarium a natural appearance, oxygenate the water, and provide habitat for fish, especially fry (babies) and for invertebrates. Some aquarium fish and invertebrates also eat live plants. Hobby aquarists use aquatic plants for aquascaping.

Brackish plants are known to occur in brackish water.

Listed alphabetically by scientific name 
The taxonomy of most plant genera is not final.

 Bacopa monnieri
 Crassula aquatica
 Cryptocoryne ciliata
 Cymodocea nodosa
 Helanthium tenellum
 Juncus roemerianus
 Myriophyllum spicatum
 Najas marina
 Sagittaria spp.
 Spartina alterniflora
 Vallisneria spp.
 Zostera marina
 Zostera noltii

Mangroves 
 Black mangrove, Avicennia germinans
 Red mangrove, Rhizophora mangle
 White mangrove, both Avicennia marina and Laguncularia racemosa

References 

Fishkeeping
Brackish water plants
Brackish aquarium plant species